Bay to Breakers is an annual footrace in San Francisco, California typically on the third Sunday of May. The phrase "Bay to Breakers" reflects the fact that the race starts at the northeast end of the downtown area a few blocks from The Embarcadero (adjacent to San Francisco Bay) and runs west through the city to finish at the Great Highway (adjacent to the Pacific coast, where breakers crash onto Ocean Beach). The complete course is 7.46 miles (12 km) long.

Bay to Breakers is well known for many participants wearing costumes.  The 1986 edition set a Guinness Word Record for being world's largest footrace with 110,000 participants, until that was surpassed by the 2010 City2Surf event in Sydney. Attendance in 2015 was reported at roughly 50,000. That year, Zappos.com signed on as the multi-year title sponsor of Bay to Breakers; the name of the race became Zappos.com Bay to Breakers. As of 2017 the title sponsor of the race is Alaska Airlines.

History

Started as a way to lift the city's spirits after the disastrous 1906 San Francisco earthquake, it has been run for more consecutive years over a given course and length than has any other footrace in the world; although other footraces are older and have been run for more consecutive years, their courses and lengths have changed over time. During World War II participation sometimes slipped below 50 registrants, but the tradition carried on. With 110,000 participants, the Bay to Breakers race held on May 18, 1986 was recognized by the Guinness Book of World Records as the world's largest footrace. That record number was partly the product of the running boom of the 1980s; currently the average participation is between 70,000 and 80,000.  Many participants do not register; of the estimated 60,000 participants in 2008, 33,000 were registered. The San Francisco Examiner, a former sponsor of the race, published a list of the first 10,000 finishers the day after the race each year.

The route is typically dotted with various local bands performing. At the end of the race is a Finish Line Festival, a gathering where participants and spectators can enjoy musical performances by various musical acts.

In February 2009, city officials and race sponsors announced changes to the race regulations. The regulations included an official ban on floats, alcohol, drunkenness and nudity.  The changes were made to assuage the concerns of San Francisco residents along the parade route, who say the race has gotten out of hand in recent years.  The news sparked outrage amongst many Bay Area residents who said the changes would destroy much that has made the race a national treasure for most of the last century.

2020 and 2021 saw a virtual race run for the first time as a live human race wasn't held. Officials cite the COVID-19 pandemic as grounds for moving the race to online. Entrants for the 2020 race were also given the option to defer their entry to 2021 or get refunded. The race returned as an in-person event on May 15, 2022.

As a race from city to beach, the race emulated the Dipsea Race, an annual race begun in 1905, which goes from downtown Mill Valley to Stinson Beach.

Organization and sponsors

Bay to Breakers is owned and operated by Wasserman. In 2010, ING completed 5 years of sponsorship. In 2011, online retailer Zazzle signed a deal to sponsor Bay to Breakers for 2 years. After Zazzle dropped out as a title sponsor in 2013, the race was picked up by Craigslist. In 2014, ZOZI, the B2B2C platform for the $125B global tours and activities market, signed a deal to sponsor Bay to Breakers.

On February 12, 2014 Bay to Breakers announced a partnership with athletic apparel company Under Armour to provide race participants with hi-tech runner's shirts. All registered participants receive perks like the Under Armour T, as well as an MVP membership to Map My Fitness, Finisher Medals, Race Bib with Timing Tag, on course entertainment and access to the Finish Line Festival. On February 18, 2015 Zappos.com became the multi-year title sponsor of the event. As such, the event was renamed "Zappos.com Bay to Breakers".

On March 30, 2017 Alaska Airlines became the title sponsor of the race in an effort to connect with the Bay Area community and events, in the same year expanding service to 13 more cities from the Bay Area.

Course

The Bay to Breakers is held on a USA Track & Field certified point-to-point course. USATF notes that the course is "wind dependent", therefore, a USA Track & Field record can only be set when it can be shown that there is no significant tailwind.

The initial course started at the Ferry Building along Market Street to Golden Gate Avenue before turning onto Divisadero Street. In 1968, the start was moved from Market Street to Howard Street and the ascension to Divisadero moved to Hayes Street. In 1983, the course was shortened from 7.51 miles to an official 12 km (7.46 miles). The current course turns west along Hayes Street and up Hayes Street Hill near Alamo Square. This is the only major incline in the race. After the hill, the race runs along the panhandle and then west through Golden Gate Park, past the Conservatory of Flowers, all the way to the Great Highway and Ocean Beach. The Great Highway will also host a Finish Line Festival, a postrace recovery and reunion area.

Participants  

Bay to Breakers is one of the most popular footraces in the United States. Large numbers of participants walk the route behind the runners, and many dress in costumes, while other wear nothing but shoes, thus lending a party atmosphere to the event. Participants have developed a number of unique, festive practices for the race. One festive tradition is the tortilla toss, during which crowds of runners waiting to cross the start line throw tortillas at one another to pass time (similar to balloon-batting at rock concerts).

Other oddities are always on the scene, including traditional characters such as Superman, Batman, Wonder Woman, and Spider-Man, as well as other unique characters spawned for the race. At least 40 pairs of Blues Brothers participated in the 1985 edition. Every year, some runners dressed as salmon run "upstream" from the breakers to the Bay.

Centipedes

Bay to Breakers features a special team division called "centipedes".  Teams of 13 or more runners will travel the full 12k course together linked by a bungee cord, or any other safe mechanism.  An additional runner, a floater, usually the team captain, is allowed to run along untethered to pace the team or substitute for a drop out runner. Despite the novelty, the centipede race is very competitive. Bay to Breakers is the official site of the World Centipede Running Championships.

While the founding of the "centipede" is commonly attributed to  Dwayne "Peanut" Harms, who was an original member of the first-ever "Pede" and a member of the  UC Davis men's track team, ("Aggies"), in 1978, Douglas L. Peck, also a UC Davis runner, founded a special division of the race in which 13 runners are connected as a unit. Peck also ran as "Head Pede," i.e., he was the leader of the centipede.

Course records 
Race organizers and media have reported that the course records set by Sammy Kitwara in 2009 and Lineth Chepkurui in 2010 are also world records at the 12 km distance; however, the International Association of Athletics Federations, the international governing body for the sport of athletics/track and field, does not recognize world records or world bests in either an indoor or outdoor 12 km. The Association of Road Racing Statisticians, a non-regulatory group that collects road running data, does recognize world records in the outdoor 12 km provided that the race course meets certain criteria. In order to rule-out the possibility of wind assistance in point-to-point courses, the ARRS stipulates that the course must have "not more than 30% of the race distance separation between that start and finish", or 3.6 km for a 12 km race. Given that the Bay to Breakers is run on a point-to-point course in which the start and finish of the event are approximately 10.5 linear kilometers apart, the ARRS recognizes two other marks as 12 km world records: Kenyan Simon Kigen's 33:46 in Portland, Oregon on May 19, 1985 and Chepkurui's 38:10 at the 2010 Lilac Bloomsday Run.

Individual winners

 = Course record

Centipede winners
 = Course record

See also

 List of annual foot races in California

Notes

References

External links

 https://www.youtube.com/watch?v=eW3OJUem7eM

 Bay to Breakers website Official Site
 Bay to Breakers Crowd Photos Thousands of photos taken by the racers
 Full list of winners from Association of Road Racing Statisticians
 Bay to Breakers Mile-O-Pede Bay to Breakers longest centipede attempt of 2006.
 Video from 2008
 Video from 2009

Clothing-optional events
Culture of San Francisco
Festivals in the San Francisco Bay Area
Foot races in California
Long-distance running competitions
Sports competitions in San Francisco
Recurring sporting events established in 1912
1912 establishments in California
Road running competitions in the United States
Annual sporting events in the United States
Annual events in California
Events in San Francisco
Spring (season) events in the United States